Aloinopsis luckhoffii is a species of succulent plant in the genus Aloinopsis native to South Africa. Like other Aloinopsis it grows in a rosette of leaves close to the ground. It has angular leaves that are covered by small, white tooth-like protrusions.

References

Luckhoffii
Plants described in 1958